Gediminas Mažeika (born 24 March 1978 in Kaunas) is a Lithuanian former professional football referee. He is a FIFA referee, 

Mažeika refereed one group stage match in the 2016–17 UEFA Champions League, between Bayer Leverkusen against Monaco in December 2016.

Mažeika retired from refereeing in October 2020, after being moved down from UEFA First Category. His last match officiated was between Nevėžis and Hegelmann Litauen on 2 October 2020.

References 

1978 births
Sportspeople from Kaunas
Living people
Lithuanian referees and umpires
UEFA Champions League referees
UEFA Europa League referees
Lithuanian football referees